Mohol Assembly constituency (247) is one of the 288 Vidhan Sabha constituencies of Maharashtra state in western India} and located in the Solapur district. It is reserved for an SC Candidate.

It is a part of the Solapur (Lok Sabha constituency).

Members of Vidhan Sabha

Madha-Mohol Vidhansabha Constituency (1951-1957)

Mohol Vidhansabha Constituency (1967–Present)

Election Result

2019 result

2014 result

See also
Mohol

References

Assembly constituencies of Solapur district
Assembly constituencies of Maharashtra